Helenium autumnale is a North American species of flowering plants in the family Asteraceae. Common names include common sneezeweed and large-flowered sneezeweed.

Description
In late summer and fall, one plant can produce as many as 100 yellow flower heads in a branching array. Each head has yellow 11–21 ray florets surrounding sometimes as many as 800 yellow disc florets. Leaves are dark green, alternate, and lance-shaped. The Latin specific epithet autumnale is in reference to the plant's autumn flowering.

Distribution and habitat
This plant is widespread across much of the United States and Canada, from Northwest Territories as far south as far northern California, Arizona, Louisiana, and Florida. It has not been found in southern or central California, or the 4 Atlantic Provinces of Canada. It grows in moist, open areas along streams and ponds as well as wet meadows.

Ecology
The flowers attract various pollinators, including bees, butterflies, and wasps. Because the plant is pollinated by insects, not wind pollinated, it does not cause seasonal allergies or sneezing, despite its common name.

Cultivation
Common sneezeweed is cultivated as a garden perennial. There are multiple named varieties varying in color and height. 'Pumilum Magnificum' is a yellow variety about two feet tall.

Uses
The plant owes its name to the use of its dried leaves in snuff, the inhaling of which causes sneezing—supposedly casting out evil spirits.

References

External links
Jepson Manual Treatment
Kemper Center for Home Gardening

photo of herbarium specimen at Missouri Botanical Garden, collected in Missouri in 2002

autumnale
Flora of North America
Plants described in 1753
Taxa named by Carl Linnaeus